Salvia palifolia is a decumbent perennial herb native to Colombia and western Venezuela, growing in grassland, cloud forest clearings, streamsides, and rocky outcrops from  elevation.

Notes

palifolia
Flora of Colombia
Flora of Venezuela